The 2. Bundesliga Nord was the second-highest level of the West German football league system in the north of West Germany from its introduction in 1974 until the formation of the single-division 2. Bundesliga in 1981. It covered the northern states of North Rhine-Westphalia, Lower Saxony, Bremen, Hamburg, Schleswig-Holstein and the city of West Berlin.

Overview 
The league was established in 1974 to reduce the number of second divisions in Germany from five to two and thereby allow direct promotion to the league winners. Along with the foundation of the 2. Bundesliga Nord, formed from clubs of the three former Regionalligas of Nord, Berlin and West, went the foundation of the 2. Bundesliga Süd, which was created from clubs of the other two Regionalligas, Süd and Südwest.

The league was created from twelve clubs from the West, seven from the North and one from Berlin, reflecting the playing strength of the old Regionalligas.

The winner of the 2. Bundesliga Nord was directly promoted to the Bundesliga, the runners-up played a home-and-away series versus the southern runners-up for the third promotion spot.

The bottom four teams were relegated to the Amateurligas, after 1978 to the new Oberligas. In 1979 only three teams were relegated. The winners of the Amateurligas/Oberligas had to determine the promoted teams by the way of a promotion play-off.

The league operated with 20 teams in its first six seasons, expanding to 22 in its last in 1981.

Until 1978, below the 2. Bundesliga Nord ranked the following Verbandsligas and Oberligas:

 Oberliga Nord
 Oberliga Berlin
 Verbandsliga Mittelrhein
 Verbandsliga Niederrhein
 Verbandsliga Westfalen 1
 Verbandsliga Westfalen 2

In 1978 these leagues were reduced to four:

 Oberliga Nord
 Oberliga Berlin
 Oberliga Nordrhein
 Oberliga Westfalen

In 1981, the two 2. Bundesligas merged into one, country-wide division. Nine clubs from the south and eight from the north plus the three relegated teams from the Bundesliga were admitted into the new league, the 2. Bundesliga.

SG Wattenscheid 09, VfL Osnabrück, Alemannia Aachen, SC Fortuna Köln and SC Preußen Münster all played every of the seven seasons of the league.

Disbanding of the 2. Bundesliga Nord 
The league was dissolved in 1981. Eight clubs of the league went to the new 2. Bundesliga while the champion and runners-up were promoted to the Bundesliga. The twelve remaining clubs were relegated to the Amateurligas.

The teams admitted to the 2. Bundesliga were:

 Hertha BSC
 Hannover 96
 Alemannia Aachen
 VfL Osnabrück
 Union Solingen
 Rot-Weiss Essen
 SC Fortuna Köln
 SG Wattenscheid 09

Relegated to the Oberligas were:

 to Oberliga Nordrhein: Viktoria Köln, 1. FC Bocholt, Rot-Weiss Oberhausen
 to Oberliga Westfalen: SC Preußen Münster, SC Herford, Rot-Weiß Lüdenscheid, SpVgg Erkenschwick
 to Oberliga Nord: VfB Oldenburg, SC Göttingen 05, Holstein Kiel, OSV Hannover
 to Oberliga Berlin: Tennis Borussia Berlin

Winners and runners-up
The winners and runners-up of the league were:

 Promoted teams in bold.

Play-offs for Bundesliga promotion 
The third promotion spot to the Bundesliga was decided through a play-off round of the runners-up of the two 2nd Bundesligas. Here are the results of this round:

 Bold denotes promotion-winner.

Placings in the 2. Bundesliga Nord 1974–1981 
The league placings from 1974 to 1981:

Source:

Key

Notes
 Westfalia Herne withdrew from the league in 1979 for financial reasons.
 FC St. Pauli was refused a licence in 1979 and relegated.
 DSC Wanne-Eicke' withdrew from the league in 1980 for financial reasons.

References

Sources
 Deutschlands Fußball in Zahlen,  An annual publication with tables and results from the Bundesliga to Verbandsliga/Landesliga, publisher: DSFS
 kicker Almanach,  The yearbook on German football from Bundesliga to Oberliga, since 1937, published by the kicker Sports Magazine
 Die Deutsche Liga-Chronik 1945–2005  History of German football from 1945 to 2005 in tables, publisher: DSFS, published: 2006

External links 
 Das deutsche Fußball-Archiv
 The 2nd Bundesliga Nord at Weltfussball.de (with round-by-round results and tables)

1981 disestablishments in Germany
Defunct association football leagues in Germany
2. Bundesliga
Football competitions in North Rhine-Westphalia
Football competitions in Lower Saxony
Football competitions in Bremen (state)
Football competitions in Hamburg
Football competitions in Schleswig-Holstein
Football competitions in Berlin
1974 establishments in West Germany
Sports leagues established in 1974
Sports leagues disestablished in 1981
Ger